Lo Esencial is the fourth greatest hits album by the American salsa band Dark Latin Groove. It was released on December 7, 2004 through Legacy Recordings, Sony BMG and Sony Music Latin. Part of the Lo Esencial compilation album series, it contains songs from his first studio album Dark Latin Groove released in 1996 by Sony Discos to his third studio album entitled Gotcha! released in 1999 on Columbia Records.

It contains hits like "Volveré", "La Quiero A Morir", "No Morirá", "Juliana", "Que Locura Enamorarme de Ti", among others.

Background 
The album contains in its essence the 3 DLG albums, the style of salsa reggae from the DLG album, Swing On! and Gotcha!. Which were the creativity of producer Sergio George the voice of their lead singer Huey Dunbar, the rough rap of James Da Barba, the freestyle and soft rap of Fragrancia.

Repertoire and recordings 
Lo Esencial DLG It contains fifteen songs, most of them covers of merengue, latin pop, pop, reggae and hip hop songs, adapting them to salsa. Four of them co-written by George, and the other eleven written and performed by other singers such as "No Morirá" written by Anne Godwin, Larry Lange and adapted into Spanish by Rodolfo Castillo and Jorge Luís Piloto being this last winner of the award in the tropical category of the American Society of Composers, Authors and Publishers in 1997.

Track listing

Personnel

Technicals

References 

2008 compilation albums
Columbia Records compilation albums
Legacy Recordings compilation albums
Sony Music Latin compilation albums
Sony Discos compilation albums
Sony BMG compilation albums
Sony BMG Norte compilation albums
Dark Latin Groove compilation albums